The 2017 season is Orlando Pride's second season. The team competes in the National Women's Soccer League, the top division of women's soccer in the United States.

Squad information

Roster

Transactions

2017 NWSL College Draft
Draft picks are not automatically signed to the team roster. The 2017 college draft was held on January 12, 2017. Orlando had two selections.

In

Out

Staff

Match results

Preseason

National Women's Soccer League

Results summary

Results

League standings

NWSL Playoffs 

The top four teams from the regular season will compete for the NWSL Championship. Final seeding to be determined by 10:30 pm EST Saturday, Sept. 30th.

Semi-finals

Media
The NWSLsoccer.com website and the Go90 app have the exclusive rights to streaming all games live on each of their platforms. In addition, the league has partnered with the Lifetime Network to air a "Game of the Week" on Saturdays for the 24-week Regular Season. The Pride were selected for 7 matches on the slate. The dates are:

Sat., Apr. 15 / 3 p.m. kickoff / Portland Thorns FC vs. Orlando Pride

Sat., Apr. 22 / 4 p.m. kickoff / Orlando Pride vs. Washington Spirit

Sat., June 24 / 3:30 p.m. kickoff** / Orlando Pride vs. Houston Dash

Sat., July 22 / 3:30 p.m. kickoff** / Chicago Red Stars vs. Orlando Pride

Sat., Aug. 12 / 7:30 p.m. kickoff** / Orlando Pride vs. Sky Blue FC

Sat., Sept. 2 / 3:30 p.m. kickoff**/ Orlando Pride vs. Boston Breakers

Sat., Sept. 9 / 3:30 p.m. kickoff** / Orlando Pride vs. Seattle Reign FC

The NWSL announced on August 17 that the Game of the Week on Lifetime for Saturday, Sept. 23 at 3:30 p.m. ET featured the Orlando Pride vs. Portland Thorns FC at Orlando City Stadium. Lifetime also aired their away match at FC Kansas City on August 26th.

** New schedule adjustments issued on June 12th by the NWSL and Lifetime Network airtimes revised for player safety due to extreme temperatures and allowance for hydration breaks.

Honors and awards

NWSL Awards

NWSL Team of the Year

NWSL Monthly Award

NWSL Player of the Month

NWSL Team of the Month

NWSL Weekly Awards

NWSL Goal of the Week

NWSL Save of the Week

Other awards
Orlando Pride forward Marta and defender Ali Krieger have been named to the 2017 National Women’s Soccer League (NWSL) Best XI, announced on October 12th.

Notes

References

External links

 

 
 
 
 
 

Orlando Pride
Orlando Pride seasons
Orlando Pride
Orlando Pride